Hole in the Paper Sky is 2008 short drama film directed by Bill Purple and produced by Jessica Biel and Michelle Purple of Iron Ocean Films. It stars Jason Clarke, Jessica Biel, Garry Marshall, Stephen Collins and Jeff Nordling and features an original score by Kerry Muzzey. It was released August 7, 2008 at the HollyShorts Film Festival.

Plot
Howard Ferp (Clarke) is a brilliant, but misanthropic, math genius who inexplicably becomes drawn to a friendship with a doomed laboratory dog.

Cast
Jason Clarke as Howard Ferp
Jessica Biel as Karen Watkins
Garry Marshall as Warren
Stephen Collins as Mr. Benson
Jeffrey Nordling as Prof. Cory

Awards
Completed in 2008 and released on iTunes and ShortsTV in 2010, Hole in the Paper Sky has garnered numerous awards and honors including:
Beverly Hills Film Festival
Best Short Film 
Best Screenplay 
Florida Film Festival
Best Short Film
Charleston International Film Festival
Best Short Film
South Dakota Film Festival
Best Director

and has been honored at the Holly Shorts Film Festival and Australia’s Flickerfest.

References

External links

http://pro.imdb.com/news/ni0239086/

2008 short films
2008 films
Films about dogs
2000s English-language films
American drama short films
2000s American films